Events from the year 1781 in Scotland.

Incumbents

Law officers 
 Lord Advocate – Henry Dundas; 
 Solicitor General for Scotland – Alexander Murray

Judiciary 
 Lord President of the Court of Session – Lord Arniston, the younger
 Lord Justice General – The Viscount Stormont
 Lord Justice Clerk – Lord Barskimming

Events 
 Construction of The Mound in Edinburgh begins.
 Montrose Lunatic Asylum, Infirmary & Dispensary, predecessor of Sunnyside Royal Hospital, founded by Susan Carnegie.
 John Howie begins publication of the 2nd edition of his Biographia Scoticana (Scots Worthies): A Brief Historical Account of the Lives, Characters, and Memorable Transactions of the Most Eminent Scots Worthies.

Births 
 March (probable) – John Burnet, engraver and painter (died 1868)
 16 March – William Mitchell, entrepreneur (died 1854)
 19 March – John Henry Wishart, surgeon (died 1834)
 12 June (probable) – Christian Isobel Johnstone, journalist and novelist (died 1857)
 12 September – John Grieve, poet (died 1836)
 14 September – James Walker, civil engineer (died 1862)
 18 September – Allan Burns, surgeon (died 1813)
 30 November – Alexander Berry, adventurer and Australian pioneer (died 1873 in Australia) 
 11 December – David Brewster, physicist (died 1868)

Deaths 
 31 March – Robert Watson, historian (born c. 1730)
 2 July – John Maule, MP (born 1706)

The arts
 4 July – Robert Burns joins the Freemasons at Tarbolton.
 12 October – first bagpipes competition in the Masonic Arms, Falkirk.

See also 

Timeline of Scottish history

References 

 
Years of the 18th century in Scotland
Scotland
1780s in Scotland